Thomas Attwood (6 October 1783 – 6 March 1856) was a British banker, economist, political campaigner and Member of Parliament. He was the leading figure of the underconsumptionist Birmingham School of economists, and, as the founder of the Birmingham Political Union, the leading figure in the public campaign for the Great Reform Act of 1832.

Life and career
Thomas Attwood was born in Halesowen, then a detached part of Shropshire, and attended Halesowen Grammar School (now Earls High School) before being moved to Wolverhampton Grammar School. On 12 May 1806, Attwood married Elizabeth Carless from Lower Ravenhurst Farm, an area which is now part of the Moor Pool estate. They had two sons, George de Bosco Attwood (15 March 1808), who stood unsuccessfully for the Walsall constituency in the 1832 general election, and Thomas Aurelius Attwood (4 March 1810). Their daughter Angela married Daniel Wakefield with whom she emigrated to New Zealand.

He founded the Birmingham Political Union in 1830. This was a political organization campaigning for cities, and large towns such as Birmingham, to be directly represented in Parliament. The Birmingham Political Union was foremost among groups lobbying the government for the passage of a Reform Bill to achieve this aim. The Days of May in 1832 brought the people's struggle for wider enfranchisement to a head, and the Great Reform Act was passed on 15 May 1832. After this success he became one of the first two Members of Parliament (MPs) for Birmingham (along with Joshua Scholefield) on 12 December 1832, a position he held until 1839.

Attwood lived at The Grove, a Georgian house in Harborne, Birmingham, between 1823 and 1846. He died in Malvern, Worcestershire in 1856.

Memorials

A grade II listed statue of Thomas Attwood by local sculptor Peter Hollins stood in Calthorpe Park from 1859 to 1974 then moved to Larches Green, Sparkbrook, Birmingham between 1974 and 2008, but is now in store. A 1993 bronze statue sat, having left his plinth, and scattered his bronze pages, on the steps of Chamberlain Square in Birmingham until 2016 when works to demolish the Central Library and rebuild Chamberlain Square began. The statue was reinstalled in 2020 once the works were completed.

Attwood Street, a residential street in Halesowen, commemorates his achievements.

See also
Peel's Bill

References

Bibliography

External links 
 www.thepeoplescharter.co.uk

Biography

1783 births
1856 deaths
English economists
Members of the Parliament of the United Kingdom for English constituencies
People educated at Wolverhampton Grammar School
People from Halesowen
People from Birmingham, West Midlands
UK MPs 1832–1835
UK MPs 1835–1837
UK MPs 1837–1841